William James Stuart (born 12 July 1996) is an English professional rugby union player who plays as a prop for Bath in Premiership Rugby.

Early life and education
Stuart started playing rugby at Andover RFC in Hampshire before moving on to Salisbury RFC in Wiltshire. He was schooled at Radley College in Oxfordshire. He went to a prep school called Farleigh School.

Rugby union career

Club
Stuart joined the Wasps academy after school. He spent time on loan in National League 1 and the RFU Championship with Blackheath, Moseley and Nottingham. Stuart made his Wasps debut on 4 November 2016 against Sale Sharks.  

On 18 January 2019 his signing for the 2019–20 season was announced by Bath.

International
Stuart represented England at the 2016 World Rugby Under 20 Championship and came off the bench in the final as England defeated Ireland to become junior World champions.

In January 2020 he received his first call up to the senior England squad for the 2020 Six Nations Championship and on 2 February 2020 made his debut as a replacement for Kyle Sinckler in the opening round defeat away to France. He also played in the final round as England beat Italy to win the tournament.

In November 2020 Stuart made his first start for England in their opening game of the Autumn Nations Cup against Georgia and subsequently came off the bench in the final as England defeated France in extra-time to win the competition.

On November 19th 2022 Stuart came off the bench against New Zealand to score his first 2 senior international tries which would subsequently draw the game 25-25, with England having been 17-3 down at half time. This made him the first England prop to score twice in a test match.

International Tries 
As of 19 November 2022

References

1996 births
Living people
English rugby union players
Bath Rugby players
Wasps RFC players
Nottingham R.F.C. players
Blackheath F.C. players
Rugby union props
England international rugby union players
Rugby union players from Westminster
People educated at Radley College